Hilary Kirsten Lindh (born May 10, 1969) is a former World Cup alpine ski racer from the United States. A specialist in the downhill event, she was a world champion and Olympic medalist.

Life 
Born in Juneau, Alaska, Lindh learned to ski and race at Eaglecrest Ski Area on Douglas Island. She was just 14 when she was named to the U.S. Ski Team. By 16, she had become the first American to win a World Junior Championships downhill title. All this was done while with Kathy Miklossy and Alex Mitkus in Utah, away from her parents. She represented the U.S. in three Olympics and won the silver medal in the downhill at the 1992 Olympics in Albertville, France. In 1994, she won the 100th World Cup race by an American skier, one of three World Cup victories during her career. She was the only American to win a medal at the 1997 World Championships, capturing the gold medal in the women's downhill in Sestriere, Italy.

During her 11 years in World Cup racing, Lindh had three victories, five podiums, and 27 top ten finishes. She retired from international competition after the 1997 World Cup season. She earned a bachelor's degree in biology at the University of Utah and a master's degree in conservation ecology in Canada, and is an environmental consultant. Married with a daughter, she resides in Whitehorse, Yukon; her husband is the mountain operations manager at the Mt. Sima ski area.

Lindh was inducted into the National Ski Hall of Fame in 2005.

Lindh is a granddaughter of performer and patron of the arts Connie Boochever and Federal appeals court judge Robert Boochever.

World Cup victories

Other results
1986 U.S. National Champion and World Junior Champion in Downhill at age 16 in a three-week span.
Four U.S. National Championships titles.

References

External links
 
 Hilary Lindh World Cup standings at the International Ski Federation
 
 

1969 births
Alpine skiers at the 1988 Winter Olympics
Alpine skiers at the 1992 Winter Olympics
Alpine skiers at the 1994 Winter Olympics
American female alpine skiers
Living people
People from Juneau, Alaska
Sportspeople from Alaska
Medalists at the 1992 Winter Olympics
Olympic silver medalists for the United States in alpine skiing
University of Utah alumni
21st-century American women